Wolfpack Kreuzotter (Common Viper) was a wolfpack of German U-boats that operated during 1942 in the World War II Battle of the Atlantic.

References

Wolfpacks of 1942
Wolfpack Kreuzotter